The 2019 NCAA Division I Indoor Track and Field Championships was the 55th NCAA Men's Division I Indoor Track and Field Championships and the 38th NCAA Women's Division I Indoor Track and Field Championships, held at the Birmingham Crossplex in Birmingham, Alabama near the campus of the host school, the University of Alabama at Birmingham. In total, thirty-four different men's and women's indoor track and field events were contested from March 8 to March 9, 2019.

The Florida Gators, representing the University of Florida, with 26 points earned by sprinter, hurdler, long jumper Grant Holloway alone, won the men's championship, while the Arkansas Razorbacks, representing the University of Arkansas, won the women's championship.

Television coverage
ESPN3 and NCAA.org broadcast the championships.

Results

Men's results

60 meters
Final results shown, not prelims

200 meters
Final results shown, not prelims

400 meters
Final results shown, not prelims

800 meters
Final results shown, not prelims

Mile
Final results shown, not prelims

3000 meters
Final results shown, not prelims

5000 meters
Final results shown, not prelims

60 meter hurdles
Final results shown, not prelims

4 × 400 meters relay
Final results shown, not prelims

Distance medley relay
Final results shown, not prelims

High jump
Final results shown, not prelims

Pole vault
Final results shown, not prelims

Long jump
Final results shown, not prelims

Triple jump
Final results shown, not prelims

Shot put
Final results shown, not prelims

Weight throw
Final results shown, not prelims

Heptathlon
Final results shown, not prelims

Men's team scores
Top 10 and ties shown

Women's results

60 meters
Final results shown, not prelims

200 meters
Final results shown, not prelims

400 meters
Final results shown, not prelims

800 meters
Final results shown, not prelims

Mile
Final results shown, not prelims

3000 meters
Final results shown, not prelims

5000 meters
Final results shown, not prelims

60 meter hurdles
Final results shown, not prelims

4 × 400 meters relay
Final results shown, not prelims

Distance medley relay
Final results shown, not prelims

High jump
Final results shown, not prelims

Pole vault
Final results shown, not prelims

Long jump
Final results shown, not prelims

Triple jump
Final results shown, not prelims

Shot put
Final results shown, not prelims

Weight throw
Final results shown, not prelims

Pentathlon
Final results shown, not prelims

Women's team scores
Top 10 and ties shown

See also
 NCAA Men's Division I Indoor Track and Field Championships 
 NCAA Women's Division I Indoor Track and Field Championships
 U.S. Track & Field and Cross Country Coaches Association announced NCAA Indoor championship field USTFCCCA

References
 

NCAA Division I Indoor Track and Field Championships
NCAA Indoor Track and Field Championships
NCAA Division I Indoor Track and Field Championships
NCAA Division I Indoor Track and Field Championships